For the 2000 Tour de France, the following 17 teams were automatically selected based on their UCI rankings. In addition, three teams were given wildcards by the Tour organisation. Each of these 20 teams sent 9 cyclists, for a total of 180:

Teams

Qualified teams

Invited teams

Cyclists

By starting number

By team

By nationality

References

2000 Tour de France
2000